Elizabeth Gilmour Malloch (6 September 1910 – 29 September 2000) was a teacher, college principal and campaigner for equality within the Episcopal Church. She was one of the first women to become a priest within the Episcopal Church.

Early life 
Malloch was born in Edinburgh, Scotland. She was the eldest of four children and the sole daughter of Jane Clarke and John Malloch. Her mother was a telegraphist in the Civil Service, while her father was an accountant.

Education 
Malloch attended James Gillespie's High School, where she won an award for 'all-round excellence', and Edinburgh Ladies' College (now the Mary Erskine School).

Malloch went on to study at the University of Edinburgh, where she achieved a First-Class Degree in French and Latin and won the University Prize. She then completed a DipEd, as well as qualifications in primary and secondary education at Moray House, the university's education branch.

Career 
Malloch initially taught at Manchester High School before beginning her teacher's training at Bingley College of Education in 1942. In 1947, she became an Inspector of Schools in Leeds before, in 1949, becoming principal of the Stafford Training College (which became Madeley College of Education and was eventually merged into Staffordshire University).

Malloch held the role of College Principal for around 20 years. During this time, she oversaw a change of site and the fast increase of student numbers, which rose from less than 400 to more than 1200. The college also introduced qualifications for mature teachers of Home Economics and a course specifically aimed at married women. By May 1970, the college had 3916 qualified teachers.

Malloch was a member of the National Advisory Council on the Training and Supply of Teachers and consulted with many organisations about teacher training and education.

Malloch retired to Essex in 1970, after being College Principal for 21 years. Her retirement ceremony was attended by Princess Margaret, in her role as Chancellor of Keele University. In 1980, she returned to Edinburgh.

Voluntary work 

Malloch volunteered with the Girlguiding Movement. In her youth, she was a Brownie at the North Morningside Church, 63rd Company, before continuing to become a Guide and a Ranger. When she moved to Manchester, she became the leader of Guide Units, including Hulme, an area which had been severely damaged by bombing during World War Two. Malloch became the vice-president of Staffordshire County Guide Association.

In her retirement, Malloch volunteered as a Soroptimist and an Open University tutor.

Roles within the Episcopalian Church 
In 1972, Malloch became a pastoral assistant and a reader at her local church. Upon her return to Edinburgh she undertook lay roles, such as reader, at St Mary's Episcopal Cathedral before becoming a deacon in 1986. After a long campaign for women to be admitted as priests, in 1994, she became one of the first women to become a priest within the Episcopal Church and the oldest of them.

Malloch was a member of the Movement for the Whole Ministry which aimed to make the Church more inclusive. She volunteered as an English tutor at YWCA Roundabout Centre, an anti-racist charity.

References

External links 

 https://www.girlguiding.org.uk/what-we-do/
 https://www.ywcascotland.org/
 https://www.soroptimistinternational.org/

19th-century Scottish Episcopalian priests
Scottish women educators
1910 births
2000 deaths
Alumni of the University of Edinburgh
Scottish scholars and academics
Scottish schoolteachers
Girlguiding
Women Anglican clergy
People educated at James Gillespie's High School
People educated at the Mary Erskine School
Clergy from Edinburgh